Belostoma testaceum is a species of giant water bug in the family Belostomatidae. It is found in the eastern United States from New York south to southern Florida and west to Texas and Michigan.

References

Belostomatidae
Hemiptera of North America
Taxa named by Joseph Leidy
Insects described in 1847
Articles created by Qbugbot